Dihydroxyphenylalanine may refer to either of two chemical compounds:

 D-DOPA (R), 3,4-dihydroxyphenylalanine
 L-DOPA (S), 3,4-dihydroxyphenylalanine, a precursor of a neurotransmitter